Claire Anita Aho (2 November 1925 – 29 November 2015), was a Finnish photographer.

Early life
Born in Helsinki, Claire Aho was the daughter of Finnish film director Heikki Aho (son of the Finnish national author Juhani Aho and his artist wife Venny Soldan-Brofeldt). Claire's mother, Dinah Selkina, was Lithuanian-born dancer.

Career
She started her career in the 1940s at the Aho & Soldan company, owned by her family. In the 1950s and 1960s, she was an early proponent of colour photography in Finland.

Aho moved to Sweden in 1974 where she worked as a photographer for several newspapers including Hufvudstadsbladet and with Nordic Museum.

Aho's photos have been exhibited in Kiel and London among others. A major retrospective of her work was held in Helsinki in 2011.

Death
She died in Stockholm on 29 November 2015 in a fire in her home. She was 90 years old.

References

1925 births
2015 deaths
Deaths from fire
Artists from Helsinki
Finnish people of Lithuanian descent
Finnish emigrants to Sweden
Accidental deaths in Sweden
20th-century women photographers
20th-century Finnish photographers
21st-century women photographers